Thomas Michael Tolliver Niles (born September 22, 1939, Lexington, Kentucky) is a diplomat who served as a career Foreign Service Officer and United States Ambassador to Canada (1985–89), the European Union (1989–91), and Greece (1993–97). He has since served as President and Vice Chairman of the United States Council for International Business and is a member of the American Academy of Diplomacy. He graduated from Harvard University and the University of Kentucky.

References

External links

Ambassadors of the United States to Canada
Ambassadors of the United States to Greece
Politicians from Lexington, Kentucky
1939 births
Living people
Ambassadors of the United States to the European Union
United States Foreign Service personnel
University of Kentucky alumni
Harvard University alumni
20th-century American diplomats